Black Hill may refer to:

Australia 
 Black Hill, Ballarat, an area of Ballarat, Victoria
 Black Hill Conservation Park, near Adelaide
 Black Hill, South Australia, formerly known as Friedensthal in South Australia
 Black Hill, New South Wales, near Newcastle
 Black Hill, Victoria, a locality near Ballarat

Hong Kong 
 Black Hill, Hong Kong, a hill in Hong Kong

India
 Kalo Dungar also known as Black Hill in Kutch, India

Ireland
 Black Hill (Wicklow Mountains), 602 m peak in County Wicklow

United Kingdom

England 
 Black Hill (Northwest Dartmoor) (584m), a hill in northwestern Dartmoor
 Black Hill (East Dartmoor) (412m), a hill on the eastern edge of Dartmoor
 Black Hill (East Sussex) (223 m), second highest point in East Sussex
 Black Hill (Herefordshire) (640m), a mountain near Craswall in the Black Mountains
 Black Hill (Peak District) (582m), a Marilyn and the highest point in West Yorkshire
 Black Hill (Quantocks) (358m), a prominent high point in the Quantock Hills, Somerset
 Black Hill Down, Dorset

Northern Ireland 
 Black Hill, County Antrim, a townland in County Antrim, Northern Ireland

Scotland 
 Black Hill (Earlston), a Marilyn in the Southern Uplands near Earlston
 Black Hill (Pentland Hills), a Marilyn in the Pentland Hills
 Black Hill (Clydesdale), a hill fort owned by the National Trust for Scotland
 Black Hill transmitting station, a radio and television broadcasting facility in Scotland
 Black Hill (Sidlaw Hills), a Marilyn in the South East of Perth & Kinross

United States 
 Black Hill (California), a hill near Morro Bay

See also 
 Blackhill (disambiguation)
 Black Hills (disambiguation) 
 Black Mountain (disambiguation)
 Black Mountains (disambiguation)
 Black Rock (disambiguation)